Hillegersberg-Schiebroek is a borough in northern Rotterdam. The borough has (on January 1, 2008) 40,846 inhabitants.

Until the annexation by Rotterdam on August 1, 1941, Hillegersberg and Schiebroek were independent communities. In 1947 in Rotterdam, the first elected councils established, in 1948 was the first Hillegersberg-Schiebroek ward council. In 1972, the Regulation on the localities in the city of Rotterdam was adopted. The neighbourhood council of Hillegersberg-Schiebroek was in 1983 converted into a municipal section.

Hillegersberg is operated by Rotterdam tram lines 4 and 8 and Schiebroek by tram line 25. The borough is also served by several bus lines from the RET and Qbuzz. 

Within the municipality Hillegersberg-Schiebroek the Stichting Wijkvervoer Hillegersberg-Schiebroek takes care of cheap transportation for the elderly and other people unable to use own or public transport. This is done under the name De Belbus.

The district consists of the following areas 
Old Hillegersberg: the oldest part of the borough.
110-Morgen: created in the fifties. The name refers to the surface of the polder.
Kleiwegkwartier: with many houses from the years 1920-1930.
Molenlaankwartier: consists mostly of post-war houses.
Terbregge: an older core on either side of Rottenburg (Terbregge is named after the bridge over the River Rotte) and a new part that was completed in 2005: New Terbregge.
Schiebroek: a modern residential area, located in the same polder, originally set up as a garden.

References

Boroughs of Rotterdam